HMS Hydra was the second ship completed of the four  breastwork monitors built for the Royal Navy during the 1870s. The ships were ordered to satisfy demands for local defence during the war scare of 1870, but the pace of construction slowed tremendously as the perceived threat of war declined. The ship spent most of her career in reserve; her only sustained period in commission was four months during the Russo-Turkish War in 1878 when the British were trying to force the Russians to end the war without seizing Constantinople. Hydra was sold for scrap in 1903.

Design and description 
They displaced . Their crew consisted of 156 officers and men.

The Cyclops-class ships and other ships of her type were described by Admiral George Alexander Ballard as being like "full-armoured knights riding on donkeys, easy to avoid but bad to close with." While not unfit to face heavy weather their decks were frequently awash in even a moderate sea. Their accommodations were rated the worst in the fleet, referred to by ordinary seamen as "ratholes with tinned air".

Propulsion
Hydra had two 4-cylinder inverted compound steam engines made by John Elder, each driving a single  propeller.

Armament
The ships mounted a pair of 10-inch rifled muzzle-loading guns in each turret. The guns could fire both solid shot and explosive shells. They were mounted on carriages that used hydraulic jacks to elevate and depress the guns.

Armour
The gun turrets had 10 inches on their faces and 9 inches on the sides and rear.

Construction
HMS Hydra was laid down on 5 September 1870 by the Robert Napier and Sons in Govan. She was launched on 28 December 1871 and commissioned in August 1872. The ship was towed to Devonport that same month for what proved to be a very lengthy fitting out period that was not completed on 31 May 1876. Cyclops cost £194,334 to build.

Refit
Although a recommendation had been made while the ships were still under construction to extend the superstructure out to the sides of the ship to improve their stability and habitability, this was not acted upon until they were refitted during the 1880s. This refit also strengthened the breastwork and upper decks, added another watertight bulkhead as well as a false keel. Four quick-firing 3-pounder Hotchkiss guns were added on the breastwork for torpedo boat defence as well as five machine guns and several searchlights. This increased their crew to approximately 191 men and added  to their displacement.

Service
HMS Hydra was the second ship to be completed, although she was the last ship of the class launched. She was placed in 1st Reserve after her completion. The ship, along with her sisters, was commissioned between April and August 1878 during the Russo-Turkish War for service with Admiral Sir Cooper Key's Particular Service Squadron in Portland Harbour. Hydra was paid off at Sheerness in August 1878 and served as tender to HMS Duncan. The ship was refitted in 1888–89 and was in Fleet Reserve at Chatham until 1901. All four ships of the class participated in the annual fleet manoeuvers in 1887, 1889–90 and 1892. HMS Hydra, like all of her sisters, was placed on the non-effective list in 1901 and sold on 7 July 1903 for £8,400.

Notes

Footnotes

References
 
 
 
 

 

Cyclops-class monitors
Monitors of the United Kingdom
1871 ships